This is a list of electoral results for the Electoral district of Footscray in Victorian state elections.

Members for Footscray

Election results

Elections in the 2020s

Elections in the 2010s

Elections in the 2000s

Elections in the 1990s

Elections in the 1980s

Elections in the 1970s

Elections in the 1960s

 The two candidate preferred vote was not counted between the Labor and DLP candidates for Footscray.

The two candidate preferred vote was not counted between the Labor and DLP candidates for Footscray.

Elections in the 1950s

The two candidate preferred vote was not counted between the Labor and DLP candidates.

Elections in the 1940s

Elections in the 1930s

Elections in the 1920s

References

 

Victoria (Australia) state electoral results by district